Clayville is a census-designated place mostly in the town of Foster and the remainder in Scituate in Providence County, Rhode Island, United States.  As of the 2010 census, it had a population of 300. It is the location of the Clayville Historic District.

Geography

Clayville is located on Rhode Island Route 14 and 102. Route 14 leads east to Providence and west to Moosup, Connecticut, while Route 102 leads north to Woonsocket and south to Exeter, Rhode Island. Clayville is located near the Westconnaug Reservoir and the Westconnaug Meadows, a wooded area home to various hiking trails that is owned by the Scituate Land Trust.

Demographics

References

Census-designated places in Providence County, Rhode Island
Providence metropolitan area
Census-designated places in Rhode Island